Holospira yucatanensis, common name Bartsch holospira, is a species of air-breathing land snail, a terrestrial pulmonate gastropod mollusk in the family Urocoptidae.

Distribution 
This species occurs in Texas, USA.

References

Urocoptidae
Gastropods described in 1906